Banks Violette (born 1973) is an artist based in Ithaca, New York.

Biography
Violette was born in Ithaca, New York and studied at the School of the Visual Arts in New York earning at BFA in 1998, and graduated with an MFA from Columbia University in 2000.

Work

Violette's work has shown internationally at galleries and museums including the Whitney Museum of American Art in New York City, the Yerba Buena Center for the Arts in San Francisco, Schirn Kunsthalle Frankfurt, Museum Boijmans van Beuningeng in Rotterdam, the Migros Museum in Zurich. He participated in the "Greater New York" exhibition at PS1 Center for Contemporary Art in New York City and "USA Today" at the Royal Academy in London. His work is featured in several prominent collections including the Musee d'Arte Moderne et Contemporain Geneva, Museum of Contemporary Art, Los Angeles, the Saatchi Gallery in London, and MOMA and the Guggenheim Museum, both in New York City. He is represented by Team Gallery in New York City, Blum & Poe in Los Angeles, Maureen Paley Gallery in London and Galerie Thaddaeus Ropac in Salzburg.

Death metal, ritual murder and teenage suicide are starting points for Banks Violette. His work is notable for combining references to excess from youth culture with minimalist form, often using glossy black and ghostly white materials. Citing examples where musical lyrics become instigating factors to real-life violence, Violette refers to an over-identification with fiction, where fantasy and reality are blurred. For example, for his first solo museum exhibition at the Whitney Museum of American Art in New York City, May 27-Oct. 2, 2005, Violette erected a life-sized recreation of a burned-out church on a black stage, inspired by an image from the cover of a black metal record and surrounded by a 5.1 surround score composed by Thorns Ltd consisting of a varied backdrop of ambiences ( www.thornsltd.no ). According to Violette, the inspiration of the piece was a series of instances of arson committed by rival metal enthusiasts in Norway, which culminated in the 1993 knife murder of Øystein Aarseth, guitarist of the black metal band Mayhem by Varg Vikernes of the band Burzum. 

In 2006, Violette curated a group show titled, War on 45 / My Mirrors are Painted Black (For You), which included fellow heavy-metal nihilistic artists. The show included a black rhombus painting entitled For Steven Parrino / FTW (Dark Matter) made by Violette, in collaboration with Gardar Eide Einarsson, and dedicated to the influential dead artist Steven Parrino.

Violette continues to make work, frequently using collaboration as a springboard for his new installations. Stephen O'Malley of Sunn O))) provided the soundtrack for Violette's 2007 double show at Team Gallery and Gladstone Gallery in New York City.

Violette's work has been described, by Francesca Gavin, as New Gothic Art.

References

Further reading

External links
 
 Team Gallery: Banks Violette
 Maureen Paley: Banks Violette
 Saatchi Gallery: Banks Violette
 New York Magazine: Banks Violette
 "Ultra-Violette" by Ben Davis, Artnet Magazine
 Banks Violette at Team and Gladstone review by Steven Stern, Frieze

1973 births
American installation artists
Living people
Columbia University School of the Arts alumni
Artists from Ithaca, New York
School of Visual Arts alumni